Aquiline may refer to
 Aquiline nose
 CIA Project AQUILINE